Leonard V. Smith (born 8 December 1957) is an American military historian.

Smith graduated from Oberlin College in 1980 with a bachelor's degree, completed his master's degree at Columbia University's School of International Affairs in 1982, and obtained a doctorate at Columbia University in 1990. He is the Frederick B. Artz Professor of History at Oberlin.

Selected publications

References

1957 births
Living people
20th-century American historians
21st-century American historians
Oberlin College alumni
Oberlin College faculty
School of International and Public Affairs, Columbia University alumni
American military historians
Historians of World War I
Historians of France